The action of 28 September 1644 was a battle that took place on 28 September 1644 about  from Rhodes, when six Maltese galleys under Gabrielle Chambres de Boisbaudran attacked an Ottoman convoy of sailing ships.

The battle
The Maltese San Lorenzo, Santa Maria and Vittoria overhauled and attacked a Turkish galleon, while San Giuseppe and San Giovanni captured a smaller sailing ship and the "capitana" chased a vessel which turned out to be Greek, before returning to fight the galleon. After 7 hours, she was captured, with 220 of the 600 or more on board dead. Boisbaudran was killed, and the senior captain, Cotoner, of the San Lorenzo, took over command. Maltese casualties were 82 killed and 170 wounded, apart from their rowers. On the voyage home, there were several storms, and eventually the galleon was abandoned near Malta, and ended up wrecked on the Calabrian coast.

Repercussions

The Turkish convoy had been heading from Constantinople to Alexandria, and carried a number of pilgrims bound for Mecca, the exiled former Chief Black Eunuch, Sünbül Agha, as well as a woman, originally considered by her captors to be one of the wives of the Ottoman Sultan Ibrahim, and her young son, who was therefore thought to be an heir to the Ottoman throne. This was eventually disputed, and many historians believe that she was a wife and/or a slave of Sünbül Agha and a former nurse of Mehmed IV. Some history books say that her name was Zafira, and that her son, named Osman, was born on January 2, 1642 - almost three months earlier than Mehmed IV (making Osman the eldest son of Ibrahim I and the true heir to the throne). Citizens of Manfredonia, Italy, believe that she was in fact a sultana – originally a girl by the name of Giacometta Beccarino, who was kidnapped from Manfredonia by Turks in 1620. (This practice was quite common among Ottoman rulers of the era; for example, the mother, the grandmother, the great-grandmother, and the first three wives of Ibrahim were all of non-Turkish origin and were all sold to the harems of their respective husbands as slaves. However, unlike Giacometta Beccarino, they were typically sold to the harem at the age of 12 to 16 and would give birth to their first child by 17.)

On the voyage home, the Maltese vessel carrying the loot stopped at Crete, then a Venetian dominion, where it took on board supplies and unloaded part of the treasure there. The Ottomans, already enraged at the loss of the ships, considered this act a breach of Venetian neutrality, and soon declared war on the Republic.

The capture of "Sultan's wife and son" was widely publicized throughout Europe. Sünbül Agha was killed in the battle, and the woman reportedly died of stress or fright during the battle or soon thereafter (some sources give her date of death as January 6, 1646). The boy was raised on Malta for several years and eventually sent to a monastery, where he became known as "Father Ottoman" or "Padre Ottomano".

Ships involved

Knights of Malta
"Capitana" of Boisbaudran.
San Lorenzo.
Santa Maria.
Vittoria.
San Giuseppe.
San Giovanni.

Ottomans
A galleon – captured, and later wrecked.
A smaller ship – captured.
Several other ships.

References

Sources
 

Conflicts in 1644
17th century in Greece
1640s in the Ottoman Empire
1644 in Europe
1644
1644